Micro-Cosmos: A Science Fiction Podcast is a podcast about a crew of terraformers on an infant planet. The series is a production of Futuristic Trail Mix Productions. It is written and directed by Jesse Smith and Lauren Tucker. The first episode of the podcast "An Infant World" premiered on March 22 2021.

Premise 
Micro-Cosmos follows the Omnitarian Establishment Crew #0137-F on their mission on the planet Ophiuchus-22.

Cast and characters 

 Jesse Smith as Athena Romero, communications officer, security specialist, and chronicler
Luka Miller as Alex de la Cruz, mission commander and navigations officer.
 Jackson Rossman as Miles Abbott, AI and engineering specialist.
 Kaleb Piper as Dr. Felix Couvillon, science officer.
 Pippa van Beek-Paterson as Unit C41/Cal, artificial intelligence unit
 Lauren Tucker as Dr. Emily Macey.
 Cassidy Leo and Val West as Charlotte.

Production 
Micro-Cosmos is written by Lauren Tucker and Jesse Smith, and directed by Jesse Smith, Lauren Tucker, and Zyrel Thompson. It features original music by Julia Barnes and sound editing by Tobias Friedman.

References

External links 

Apple podcasts
Podbay

Audio podcasts
Science fiction podcasts
Fiction about outer space
2021 podcast debuts